The Rifian barbel (Luciobarbus rifensis) is a species of cyprinid fish endemic to northern Morocco found from the  Loukkos River basin on the western Atlantic slope to the Laou River basin on the eastern Mediterranean.

References 

Rifian barbel
Endemic fauna of Morocco
Freshwater fish of North Africa
Rifian barbel